Darreh Bagh or Darrehbagh may refer to:

Chaharmahal and Bakhtiari Province
 Darreh Bagh, Kuhrang, a village in Kuhrang County
 Darreh Bagh, Lordegan, a village in Lordegan County

Isfahan Province
 Darreh Bagh, Isfahan, a village in Ardestan County

Kerman Province
 Darreh Bagh, Kerman, a village in Shahr-e Babak County

Lorestan Province
 Darreh Bagh, Azna, a village in Azna County
 Darreh Bagh, Khorramabad, a village in Khorramabad County
 Darreh Bagh, Pol-e Dokhtar, a village in Pol-e Dokhtar County

Yazd Province
 Darreh Bagh, Yazd, a village in Taft County

See also
 Dar Bagh (disambiguation)